You Changed My Life is a 2009 Filipino romantic comedy film directed by Cathy Garcia-Molina and starring John Lloyd Cruz and Sarah Geronimo. It is the sequel to the 2008  film A Very Special Love.

It received an “A” rating from the Cinema Evaluation Board of the Philippines.
 
Filming began in November 2008, and it was released on February 25, 2009, by Star Cinema and Viva Films. The film surpassed Sukob to become the highest grossing Filipino film at the time until it was surpassed by No Other Woman (2011). More newer films have surpassed the film. It is currently the twenty-first highest grossing Filipino film of all time.

The film was followed by a second sequel, It Takes a Man and a Woman, released on March 30, 2013.

Plot 
It has been six months since Laida Magtalas and Miggy Montenegro became a couple. Laida was promoted from executive assistant to accounts executive, while Miggy has been doing well as he is being mentored by his older brother Art Montenegro. Laida gets an offer from her aunt to work in Canada where she is being given a good recommendation.

Miggy's father vouches for his promotion as general manager of the family's industrial laundry business in Laguna but this also prompts a few hesitations from Art. The promotion proves difficult for the couple's relationship as a result of time constraints and the relationship suffers from the pressures of being apart. Their relationship becomes even more troubled with the introduction of Macoy. Macoy is Laida's long time friend whom she broke up with after he did not keep his promise of them going together to the same college. Their situation turns worse when Miggy has to fix a few issues in the plant when he accepted orders from his brother Art's ex-girlfriend, Christina. His company's demand volume is too much for their man-power thus making some workers unhappy which leads to a labor strike. His father steps in and helps resolve the issue but Miggy has to set expectations to the clients affected by the strike. Those business meetings which preceded prompts Miggy to almost miss a wedding that Laida and he would go to. He arrives too late for the wedding and sees Laida crying with Macoy beside her. After Miggy and Laida have a heated argument, both of them decide to separate for a period of time.

The industrial laundry business soon is working in optimum efficiency which makes his brother trust him more, to the point of having him take over the family telecom stake in China. In the Montenegro group of companies annual general meeting, Laida sees Miggy for the first time after the argument, with Laida simply saying "Good morning, Sir", then leaving the venue right away. At the actual meeting, Miggy is announced as the officer in charge of the telecoms business.

Macoy talks sense to Laida to go back and pursue Miggy. She meets Miggy in the garden where she says she still loves him. Miggy suggests that it will be a more challenging time for them, but he also says he loves her. Afterwards, the two share a kiss with each other.

Cast

Main cast
John Lloyd Cruz as Miguel "Miggy" Montenegro
Sarah Geronimo as Adelaida "Laida" Magtalas
Rayver Cruz as Marcelo "Macoy" Romero

Supporting cast
Dante Rivero as Luis Montenegro
Rowell Santiago as Arturo "Art" Montenegro
Matet de Leon as Zoila
Bernard Palanca as Mondy
Joross Gamboa as John Rae
Gio Alvarez as Vincent
Al Tantay as Tomas Magtalas
Irma Adlawan as Baby Magtalas
Beverly Salviejo as Manang Vida
Bing Pimentel as Alice Montenegro
Johnny Revilla as Roger Montenegro
Miles Ocampo as Rose Magtalas
Arno Morales as Stephen Magtalas
Andre Garcia as Lion Magtalas
Daphne Oseña-Paez as Anya Montenegro
Mikee Cojuangco-Jaworski as Christina

Reception 
The film was graded "A" by the Cinema Evaluation Board. The Philippine Entertainment Portal describe the film as "Entertaining and engaging!". ReelAdvice.net gave the film 3.5/5 ratings.

Box office 
The film was a huge box office success, earning ₱ 232,209,842 in its seven weeks run at the box office.

Home video 
The film was made available on original DVDs and VCDs distributed by Viva Video, Inc. and Star Home Video on April 2009.

Awards

References 

2009 films
Films directed by Cathy Garcia-Molina
2009 romantic comedy films
2000s Tagalog-language films
Star Cinema films
Viva Films films
Philippine romantic comedy films
Philippine sequel films
2000s English-language films
2009 multilingual films
Philippine multilingual films